Steiner Studios is a film studio at Brooklyn Navy Yard in Brooklyn, New York City. It is the largest film and television production studio complex in the United States outside Hollywood. Steiner Studios, spread across , contains 30 soundstages as well as additional support space.

Steiner Studios was founded in 1999, and the first soundstages at the site opened in November 2004. In 2012, Steiner Studios reached an agreement with the Brooklyn Navy Yard Development Corporation to convert its 20-acre Naval Annex Historic Campus into a media and technology hub; the expansion is projected to be completed in the mid-2020s. In 2020, Steiner Studios announced a new $550 million, 900,000 square-foot project in Sunset Park, Brooklyn.

Most recently, Inventing Anna, The Marvelous Mrs. Maisel, West Side Story, Tick, Tick...Boom!, and And Just Like That… have been filmed at Steiner Studios.

Description

Steiner Studios is home to thirty soundstages, totaling  and making it New York’s largest production facility.  There is also an additional  of support space, which includes offices, dressing rooms, hair and make-up rooms, wardrobe rooms, mill shops, a spray booth, and prop storage. Office and support spaces have access to satellite uplinks and a high-speed data backbone.

Soundstages are equipped with full grids from 26 to 45 feet, are column-free, sound-insulated, and offer loading and staging areas. Built to accommodate film, high-definition television (HDTV) and digital camera productions, each stage is wired with a minimum of 4,800 amps of power and 50 to 200 tons of cooling. Stages are accessed via  to  elephant doors.

Each stage is attached to production and support space, including make-up and dressing rooms, green rooms, storage areas, conference rooms, and offices. In addition to the enclosed building areas, there are assembly and secondary areas for "lay-down" of materials and equipment used in large-scale film projects. The facility features a 100-seat screening room and a full commissary, on-site parking, 24/7 security and lighting and grip equipment services.

History
Steiner Studios opened in November 2004. The site initially included a  studio spread across five stages. 

An expansion of the facility through renovation of a seven-story building in the Navy Yard, was announced by chairman Douglas Steiner, on February 15, 2007. The studio was the location of the 17th annual Gotham Awards held on November 27, 2007.

In March 2012, Mayor Michael Bloomberg unveiled five new sound stages (a total of ) at Steiner Studios. The new sound stages all feature two or three wall cycloramas.

Brooklyn College opened the Feirstein Graduate School of Cinema on Steiner Studios' production lot for the fall 2013 semester. It is the first public graduate school of film in New York and is thought to be the only film school in the country located on a working film lot. In November 2013, Carnegie Mellon University announced the creation of the Integrative Media Program at Steiner Studios.

Expansions
In 2012, Steiner Studios proposed building a media campus at the former site of Brooklyn Naval Hospital. located just east of the existing Steiner Studios lot. Steiner Studios planned to restore the hospital buildings starting in 2017, and restoration was expected to take nearly a decade.

The extant buildings at the hospital included the main building, surgeon's house, quarters 4 through 7, bachelors' and nurses' quarters, carriage houses and stables, the medical supply depot, and the morgue/lumber shed. Steiner proposed to convert these structures into production, post-production, and production support space. The hospital had been listed on the National Register of Historic Places (NRHP) in 2014. Steiner Studios' plan calls for the restoration of 15 NRHP-listed buildings at the Brooklyn Naval Hospital campus, but would also demolish some of the NRHP-contributing artifacts to make way for the new facility, Structures with a total floor area of  would be demolished and replaced with landscaped lawn space.

Sunset Park expansion

Productions

Film

Television

See also
 Gotham Awards

References

External links
Official website

American film studios
Culture of Brooklyn
Entertainment companies based in New York City
Entertainment companies established in 2004
2004 establishments in New York City
Brooklyn Navy Yard